Calixte Zagré (died 6 December 2011) was a former Burkinabé football manager, who managed the Burkina Faso national team in 1996.

References

External links
NFT Profile

2011 deaths
Burkinabé football managers
Burkina Faso national football team managers
Burkinabé Premier League players
Year of birth missing
21st-century Burkinabé people
Association footballers not categorized by position
Association football players not categorized by nationality